Babaj i Bokës is a village in Gjakova Municipality, Kosovo. According to the Kosovo Agency of Statistics (KAS) estimate from the 2011 census, there were 595 people residing in Babaj i Bokës, with Albanians constituting the majority of the population.

Notes

References 

Villages in Gjakova